Wheatland Township is a township in Ellis County, Kansas, USA.  As of the 2010 census, its population was 386.

Geography
According to the USGS, it contains one cemetery, Saint Francis.

The streams of Big Timber Creek and Shelter Creek run through this township.

Transportation
Wheatland Township contains two airports or landing strips: Philip Ranch Airport and Stecklein Field.

References
 USGS Geographic Names Information System (GNIS)

External links
 US-Counties.com
 City-Data.com

Townships in Ellis County, Kansas
Townships in Kansas